Dörverden is a railway station located in Dörverden, Germany. The station is located on the Bremen–Hanover railway. The train services are operated by Deutsche Bahn.

Train services
The following services currently call at the station:

Regional services  Norddeich - Emden - Oldenburg - Bremen - Nienburg - Hanover
Regional services  Bremerhaven-Lehe - Bremen - Nienburg - Hanover
Local services  Rotenburg - Verden - Nienburg - Minden

References

Railway stations in Lower Saxony